Abdul Kadir Mollah City College also known as AKMCC is a college in Bangladesh. It was established in 2006 in Narsingdi District beside the Dhaka-Sylhet highway. It is a private college.

History
Abdul Kadir Mollah City College was founded by Abdul Kadir Mollah. Mr. Abdul Kadir Mollah is the founder, chairman and managing director of Thermax Group Ltd. He is also the founder and Chairman of “ Mojid Mollah Foundation” a non profit charitable organization for social welfare situated in Narshingdi. Abdul Kadir Mollah City College was one of them.

Academic performance
447 students from Abdul Kadir Mollah City College appeared in the 2015 Higher Secondary Certificate (HSC) examinations. The college achieved a 100 percent pass rate with 380 students getting GPA-5. Colleges were not ranked by results in 2015, but the college placed fifth among colleges under the Dhaka Education Board in 2009, seventh in 2011, and second in 2012, 2013, and 2014. In 2015 and 2016 the college placed in Dhaka Education Board with 100% pass rate. In 2017 and 2018 the college again placed in Dhaka Board with 100% pass rate in 2018.

References

Further reading

External links
Official  website
 Official Facebook page

Narsingdi District
Colleges in Narsingdi District